Claudia Zornoza Roca-Rey (born 12 February 1990) is a Peruvian female badminton player. She came into international badminton arena after claiming gold medal in the women's doubles partnering with Katherine Winder at the 2008 Puerto Rico International. She also clinched the gold medal in the mixed doubles at the 2009 Puerto Rico International partnering with Bruno Monteverde. 

Claudia went onto participate at the 2010 South American Games, claimed gold medals in the women's doubles along with Katherine Winder and in the mixed team event. Claudia Zornoza graduated at the Colegio Santa Ürsula in 2006.

Achievements

Pan Am Championships 
Women's doubles

South American Games
Women's doubles

Pan Am Junior Championships 
Girls' singles

Girls' doubles

BWF International Challenge/Series
Women's doubles

Mixed doubles

 BWF International Challenge tournament
 BWF International Series tournament
 BWF Future Series tournament

References

External links 

1990 births
Living people
Sportspeople from Lima
Peruvian female badminton players
South American Games gold medalists for Peru
South American Games medalists in badminton
Competitors at the 2010 South American Games
20th-century Peruvian women
21st-century Peruvian women